Gareth Russell is a Scottish musician, best known as the former bass guitarist for the indie rock band Idlewild. Russell joined the band in 2006, following the departure of Gavin Fox, and recorded two studio albums with the band: Make Another World (2007) and Post Electric Blues (2009).

Russell also performed in Astrid until their split, and was also a member of The Reindeer Section.

Discography

with Idlewild
 2007: Make Another World
 2009: Post Electric Blues

with Astrid
 1999: Strange Weather Lately
 2001: Play Dead
 2004: One in Four

with The Reindeer Section
 2001: Y'All Get Scared Now, Ya Hear!

References

Year of birth missing (living people)
Living people
Scottish bass guitarists